Matkah Point is the northern entrance point to Holluschickie Bay, on the west coast of James Ross Island, Antarctica. The name, recommended by the UK Antarctic Place-Names Committee, arose from association with Holluschickie Bay; Matkah was the mother of the White Seal, Kotick, in Rudyard Kipling's The Jungle Book.

References

Headlands of James Ross Island